Raghunathpur is a Community development block and a town in district of Siwan, in Bihar state of India. It is one out of 13 blocks of Siwan Subdivision. The headquarter of the block is at Raghunathpur town.

From Raghunathpur Andar is in north direction and same road leads to district head quarter Siwan. 

North direction of Raghunathpur Holi river Sarju blows. 

The block is divided into many Gram Panchayats and villages.

Gram Panchayats
Gram panchayats of Raghunathpur block in Siwan Subdivision, Siwan district.

Badua
Chakari
Dighwalia
Gabhirar
Gopi Patiaon
Karsar
Khujwan
Kushahara
Narhan
Nikhti kala
Panjwar
Phulwaria
Raghunath pur
Rajpur
Santhi
Tari

Notable people

Manoj Bhawuk
Ramdev Singh

See also
Siwan Subdivision
Administration in Bihar

References

Community development blocks in Siwan district